Five regiments of the British Army have been numbered the 72nd Regiment of Foot:
 72nd Regiment of Foot, raised as the Earl of Berkeley's Regiment of Foot in 1745 and disbanded in 1746
 72nd Regiment of Foot (1758), raised by re-designation of 2nd Battalion, 33rd Regiment of Foot in 1758 and disbanded in 1763
 72nd Regiment of Foot (Invalids), raised as 82nd Regiment of Foot (Invalids) in 1757, re-numbered as the 72nd Regiment of Foot in 1764 and disbanded in 1767
 72nd Regiment of Foot (Royal Manchester Volunteers), raised in 1777 and disbanded in 1783
 72nd Regiment, Duke of Albany's Own Highlanders, raised in 1778 as the Seaforth (Highland) Regiment, re-numbered as the 72nd Foot in 1786 and amalgamated in 1881